Joseph Vincent O'Leary (December 13, 1890 – December 29, 1964) was an American politician who served as New York State Comptroller.

Life 
He was born on December 13, 1890, in New York City.

In 1938, he ran on the American Labor ticket for New York State Attorney General, but was defeated.

He was New York State Commissioner of Standards and Purchase when Governor Herbert H. Lehman appointed O'Leary New York State Comptroller after the death of Morris S. Tremaine to fill the vacancy. Tremaine died on October 12, 1941, and O'Leary was appointed on October 17 with the understanding that he was nominated to run on the Democratic and American Labor tickets at a special election for Comptroller in November, but on October 27 the New York Court of Appeals ruled that no such special election is to be held and O'Leary continued in office until the end of 1942. He was defeated for re-election on both tickets in November 1942.

He was a founding member of the Liberal Party of New York, and was its Secretary in 1958.

He died on December 29, 1964, at Beth Israel Medical Center in Manhattan.

Sources 
 Political Graveyard
CONTROLLER VOTE IN STATE BARRED BY APPEAL COURT in NYT on October 28, 1941 (subscription required)
A.L.P. MAN NAMED TO TREMAINE JOB IN 2-PARTY DEAL in nYT on October 18, 1941 (subscription required)

1890 births
1964 deaths
New York State Comptrollers
Politicians from New York City
American Labor Party politicians
Liberal Party of New York politicians
20th-century American politicians